The name Vernon has been used for seven tropical cyclones worldwide, five in the Western Pacific Ocean and two in the Australian region.

In the Western Pacific:
 Typhoon Vernon (1980) – relatively strong typhoon which stayed at sea
 Tropical Storm Vernon (1984) – struck Vietnam
 Typhoon Vernon (1987) (Diding) – passed northeast of the Philippines and skirted Taiwan
 Typhoon Vernon (1990) – briefly threatened Japan before turning northeast, eventually affecting no land areas
 Typhoon Vernon (1993) – struck Japan and brought heavy rainfall, causing 2 deaths and 4 injuries

In the Australian region:
 Cyclone Vernon (1986) – moderately strong tropical storm which stayed off the coast of Queensland
 Cyclone Vernon (2022) – strong tropical cyclone that remained over the open Indian Ocean

Pacific typhoon set index articles
Australian region cyclone set index articles